The 2014 Jacksonville Dolphins football team represented Jacksonville University in the 2014 NCAA Division I FCS football season. They were led by eighth-year head coach Kerwin Bell and played their home games at D. B. Milne Field. They were a member of the Pioneer Football League. They finished the season 9–2, 7–1 in PFL play. The 7–1 record would have been good enough to claim a share of the PFL title. However, Jacksonville withdrew from contention for the PFL title and the FCS Playoffs as a result of its internal review of compliance matters regarding the PFL’s financial aid rules.

Schedule

Source: Schedule

References

Jacksonville
Jacksonville Dolphins football seasons
Jacksonville Dolphins football